is a Japanese actress, voice actress and singer who was contracted to Production Baobab and is now signed to Axlone. In direct contrast to her cute-and-vulnerable moé typecasting, Yūko in real life is a devotee of biker culture who dresses and acts as such when not working, right down to her motorcycle. This is parodied in the 23rd episode of Lucky Star, in which she appears as a masculine Bōsōzoku-styled character of herself called Gotouza, a nickname given to her by fellow voice actor Tomokazu Sugita. She is also a fluent English speaker.

In 2012, she announced that she is suffering from idiopathic thrombocytopenic purpura and systemic lupus erythematosus.
She is currently performing voice actor activity, while frequently going to the hospital, but recovered on October 4.

Filmography

Anime

Japanese dubs 
Courage the Cowardly Dog (Bunny)
Hey Arnold! (Eugene Horowitz, Lulu and Lila Sawyer)
Little Lulu (Annie)
Carrie (Carrie White (young))
Cry-Baby (Suzy Q.)

Video games

Eroge

Theme song performance
Fushigiboshi no Futagohime (ED1)
The Melancholy of Haruhi Suzumiya (OP1/ED)
Special A (OP1/ED2)
Kimi ga Aruji de Shitsuji ga Ore de (ED1)
Zoku Sayonara Zetsubou Sensei (ED1)
Lovedol~Lovely Idol~ (OP/ED/single)

References

External links
 Official blog 
 Official agency profile 
 Yūko Gotō at Ryu's Seiyuu Infos
 

1975 births
Living people
Voice actresses from Aichi Prefecture
Japanese women pop singers
Japanese video game actresses
Japanese voice actresses
Lantis (company) artists
People with lupus
Anime singers
20th-century Japanese actresses
20th-century Japanese women singers
20th-century Japanese singers
21st-century Japanese actresses
21st-century Japanese women singers
21st-century Japanese singers
Production Baobab voice actors